El Kalimat School is an English-language international school in Bouzaréah, Algiers.

References

External links
 El Kalimat School

International schools in Algeria
Schools in Algiers
Educational institutions with year of establishment missing